BBC Radio 1's Live Lounge 2015 is a compilation album consisting of live tracks played on Clara Amfo's BBC Radio 1 show, both cover versions and original songs. The album was released on 30 October 2015, and is the eleventh in the series of Live Lounge albums.

Track listing

References 

2015 compilation albums
2015 live albums
Live Lounge
Covers albums
Rhino Entertainment compilation albums
Sony Music compilation albums
Universal Music Group compilation albums
Universal Music TV albums